Lasse Ottesen (born 8 April 1974) is a Norwegian former ski jumper who competed from 1991 to 2002.

Career
He grew up in the little hamlet of Aurskog in eastern Norway and represented the local sports club Aurskog-Finstadbru SK.

His biggest success at the 1994 Winter Olympics in Lillehammer where he earned a silver medal in the Individual Normal Hill. Ottesen also finished 4th at the 1995 Nordic skiing World Championships in the Individual Large Hill. In 1997, he sat the world record in Planica with 212 meters.

After retiring, he became a coach. He was the ski jumping coach for the Nordic combined teams of Norway and then the United States, and later became the head coach for the United States.

Lasse is now Nordic combined director in the International Ski Federation (FIS).
He’s work for FIS has been outstanding since he was offered the job in 2011, particularly he’s work for spearheading women’s Nordic Combined.

Controversy
In the 1993/94 Four Hills Tournament, Ottesen was accused of helping his compatriot Espen Bredesen beat German Jens Weißflog. Weißflog was protecting an 8-point lead before the last jump, and the jumping order was Bredesen – Ottesen – Weißflog. After Bredesen's jump, Ottesen delayed his jump and was disqualified. The wind conditions being worsened, Weißflog lost 20 points on his last jump, lost the tourney and complained of foul play afterwards.

Ski jumping world record

References

External links
 
 

1974 births
Living people
People from Aurskog-Høland
Norwegian male ski jumpers
Olympic ski jumpers of Norway
Ski jumpers at the 1992 Winter Olympics
Ski jumpers at the 1994 Winter Olympics
Ski jumpers at the 1998 Winter Olympics
Norwegian ski jumping coaches
Olympic medalists in ski jumping
Medalists at the 1994 Winter Olympics
Olympic silver medalists for Norway
Sportspeople from Viken (county)
20th-century Norwegian people